Corban Collins (born July 21, 1994) is an American professional basketball player for KB Trepça of the Kosovo Basketball Superleague. He played college basketball at LSU, Morehead State and Alabama.

College career

LSU
Collins began his collegiate career playing for the LSU Tigers and averaged 2.6 points and 9.1 minutes played in 27 games as a freshman. He decided to leave the program following the end of the season and chose to transfer to Morehead State over Murray State and Central Florida.

Morehead State
Collins spent three seasons as a member of the Morehead State Eagles, sitting out as a true sophomore due to NCAA transfer rules. As a redshirt sophomore, Collins made 19 starts for the Eagles and averaged 8.8 points per game. He was named second team All-Ohio Valley Conference after leading the Eagles with 11.0 points per game and finishing second in the conference with a .425 Three-point shooting percentage.

Alabama
Collins played his final season at Alabama. He averaged 7.0 points and 1.8 rebounds per game.

Professional career

Kirchheim Knights
Collins signed with VfL Kirchheim Knights of the German second division, ProA, on October 9, 2017. In his first professional season, Collins finished third in the league with 17.3 points per game and recorded 4.6 rebounds, 3.8 assists and 1.2s steals per game.

Luleå
Collins signed with BC Luleå of the Swedish Basketligan on July 7, 2018. Collins finished second in the Basketligan in scoring with 19.4 points per game and while also averaging 4.4 rebounds, 4.9 assists (6th in the league) and 1.6 steals per game.

Pallacanestro Cantù
Collins signed with Pallacanestro Cantù of the Italian Lega Basket Serie A on July 26, 2019. Collins left the team in December of 2019. He averaged 6.8 points, 1.7 rebounds and 1.8 assists over 11 games for Cantu.

Blu Basket 1971
Collins signed with Blu Basket 1971 of the Italian second division, Serie A2 Basket, on December 30, 2019. He averaged 19.1 points, 3.1 rebounds and 3.8 assists per game.

A.S. Junior Pallacanestro Casale
On November 19, 2020, Collins signed with A.S. Junior Pallacanestro Casale. In five games, he averaged 12 points and 3.4 assists per game.

Helsinki Seagulls
On January 19, 2021, Collins signed with the Helsinki Seagulls of the Korisliiga. He averaged 8.0 points, 2.6 rebounds, and 2.5 assists per game.

KB Trepça
On January 13, 2022, Collins signed with KB Trepça of the Kosovo Basketball Superleague.

References

External links
LSU Tigers bio
Morehead State Eagles bio
Alabama Crimson Tide bio
RealGM profile

1997 births
Living people
Alabama Crimson Tide men's basketball players
American expatriate basketball people in Germany
American expatriate basketball people in Italy
American expatriate basketball people in Sweden
American men's basketball players
Basketball players from North Carolina
Lega Basket Serie A players
LSU Tigers basketball players
Morehead State Eagles men's basketball players
Pallacanestro Cantù players
Shooting guards
VfL Kirchheim Knights players